Cathédrale du Sacré-Cœur (English: Cathedral of the Sacred Heart) is a modern Roman Catholic cathedral in Port Vila, Vanuatu. It is the seat of the Roman Catholic Diocese of Port-Vila. The church is dedicated to the sacred Heart of Jesus.

References

Roman Catholic cathedrals in Vanuatu
Port Vila